Islington Station can refer to:

 Islington station (MBTA), a commuter rail station in Westwood, Massachusetts, United States
 Islington railway station, a commuter rail station in Adelaide, South Australia, Australia
 Islington station (Toronto), a subway station in Toronto, Ontario, Canada
 Highbury & Islington station, a railway and London Underground station in the London borough of Islington
 New Islington tram stop in Manchester, England